The short-billed pipit (Anthus furcatus) is a species of bird in the family Motacillidae.

It is found in Argentina, Brazil, Paraguay and Uruguay. Its natural habitats are temperate grassland and subtropical or tropical high-altitude grassland. The Puna pipit is sometimes considered a subspecies.

References

Further reading

short-billed pipit
Birds of the Puna grassland
Birds of Argentina
Birds of Uruguay
short-billed pipit
Taxonomy articles created by Polbot
Taxa named by Frédéric de Lafresnaye
Taxa named by Alcide d'Orbigny